Thorneside railway station is located on the Cleveland line in Queensland, Australia. It serves the suburb of Thorneside in Redland City.

History
In 1889, the Cleveland line was extended from Manly to the original Cleveland station.

Thorneside station opened in 1889 as Waterloo. It was closed in 1890 and reopened in 1909 as Ransome's railway siding. In 1912, the station closed again when Ransome's railway siding was relocated over Tingalpa Creek. In 1917, the station reopened under the current name of Thorneside.

On 1 November 1960, the station closed when the line was truncated to Lota. The station reopened on 25 September 1982 and served as an interim terminus as the line was being rebuilt to Cleveland. Adjacent to the station lies a turning angle.

Services
Thorneside is served by Cleveland line services from Shorncliffe, Northgate, Doomben and Bowen Hills to Cleveland.

Services by platform

Transport links
Transdev Queensland operate one route from Thorneside station:
253: to Capalaba

References

External links

Thorneside station Queensland's Railways on the Internet
[ Thorneside station] TransLink travel information

Railway stations in Australia opened in 1889
Railway stations in Redland City